Zvon means "bell" in some Slavic languages or "bell sound" in Russian. It may also refer to:
 Ljubljanski zvon, a Slovene  journal
 Byelaruski zvon, a Belarusian newspaper
 Velký Zvon, a hill in Bohemia
 Russian Orthodox bell ringing
 Evening Bell (song) (Večernij zvon), a Russian song